= Juan José Lara Ortiz =

Spanish wheelchair basketball player

Personal information
- Nationality: Spanish

Sport
- Country: Spain
- Sport: Wheelchair basketball

Juan Jose Lara Ortiz (born November 30, 1965, in Sevilla) is a wheelchair basketball athlete from Spain. He has a physical disability: he is 1 point wheelchair basketball player. He played wheelchair basketball at the 1996 Summer Paralympics. His team was fourth.
